Abdul Qadir was a Pakistani cricketer who took 17 five-wicket hauls during his career in international cricket. In cricket, a five-wicket haul (also known as a "five–for" or "fifer") refers to a bowler taking five or more wickets in a single innings. This is regarded as a notable achievement, and fewer than 50 bowlers have taken more than 15 five-wicket hauls at international level in their cricketing careers. A right-arm leg spin bowler who represented his country between 1977 and 1994, Yahoo! Cricket wrote that Qadir "was a master of the leg-spin" and "mastered the googlies, the flippers, the leg-breaks and the topspins."

Qadir made his Test debut in 1977 against England at the Gaddafi Stadium, Lahore. His first Test five-wicket haul came the following year against the same team in a match at the Niaz Stadium, Hyderabad. In March 1984 against the English at the Gaddafi Stadium, he took a five-wicket haul in both innings of a Test match for the first time. He repeated this feat only once more in his career, at the National Stadium, Karachi, against the same team, in December 1987. His career-best figures for an innings were 9 wickets for 56 runs against England at the Gaddafi Stadium, in November 1987. In Tests, Qadir was most successful against the English taking eight of his five-wicket hauls against them. He took ten or more wickets in a match on five occasions. Qadir claimed 15 five-wicket hauls in his Test career, and Pakistan never lost any of the games on such instances.

Qadir made his One Day International (ODI) debut during the 1983 Cricket World Cup against New Zealand at Edgbaston. His first ODI five-wicket haul came in June 1983, against Sri Lanka, a match which Pakistan won at the Headingley Cricket Ground in Leeds. He took 5 wickets for 44 runs in the match, which is his best performance in ODIs. Qadir took two five-wicket hauls in ODI cricket. , he is twenty-sixth overall among all-time combined five-wicket haul takers, a position he shares with Fred Trueman and Derek Underwood. He is fifth in the list of five-wicket haul takers for Pakistan, all formats of the game combined.

Key

Tests

One Day Internationals

Notes

References

External links
 
 

Qadir
Qadir, Abdul